Andreas Glöckner (born 1950 in Sondershausen) is a German musicologist, a Bach scholar who has served as the dramaturge of the Bachfest Leipzig.

Career 
Glöckner studied musicology at the University of Leipzig. He worked at the Bach Archive Leipzig from 1979 until 2015 and continues to work in a voluntary capacity at that institution. He received his Ph.D. from the University of Halle in 1988 and taught at the universities of Leipzig and Dresden. Since 2001 he has been a member of the external commission for the project Bach-Repertorium at the Saxon Academy of Sciences. He has published books, journal articles and radio features, and was the dramaturge of the Bachfest Leipzig from 1994 to 2016.

Publications 
 (ed.) Kalendarium zur Lebensgeschichte Johann Sebastian Bachs, Evangelische Verlagsanstalt, 2008
 Die Notenbibliothek der Thomasschule Bachfest Leipzig, 2012

References

External links 
 Andreas Glöckner homepages.bw.edu
 Andreas Glöckner Discogs
 Dokumente zur Geschichte des Thomaskantorats, Bd. 2 / Vom Amtsantritt Johann Sebastian Bachs bis zum Beginn des 19. Jahrhunderts Carus-Verlag
 On the performing forces of Johann Sebastian Bach's Leipzig church music Early Music 2010
 Andreas Glöckner, Dr. Sächsische Akademie der Wissenschaften zu Leipzig
 Mitarbeiter bach-leipzig.de

1950 births
Living people
German musicologists
Bach scholars
University of Music and Theatre Leipzig alumni
21st-century conductors (music)